The fastest times swum in events at the Universiades (World University Games) are listed by International University Sports Federation (FISU) as a  list of Universiade records in swimming. Swimming has been part of every Universiade, and the events are always held in a long course (50 m) pool. The last Universiade was held in Taipei, Taiwan in 2017.

All records were set in finals unless noted otherwise.

Men

Women

See also
List of Universiade records in athletics

References

Universiade
Records
Swimming